An extraterrestrial or alien is any extraterrestrial lifeform; a lifeform that did not originate on Earth. The word extraterrestrial means "outside Earth". The first published use of extraterrestrial as a noun occurred in 1956, during the Golden Age of Science Fiction.

Extraterrestrials are a common theme in modern science-fiction, and also appeared in much earlier works such as the second-century parody True History by  Lucian of Samosata.

Gary Westfahl writes:

History

Pre-modern
Cosmic pluralism, the assumption that there are many inhabited worlds beyond the human sphere predates modernity and the development of the heliocentric model and is common in mythologies worldwide. The 2nd century writer of satires, Lucian, in his True History claims to have visited the moon when his ship was sent up by a fountain, which was peopled and at war with the people of the Sun over colonisation of the Morning Star. Other worlds are depicted in such early works as the 10th-century Japanese narrative, The Tale of the Bamboo Cutter, and the medieval Arabic The Adventures of Bulukiya (from the One Thousand and One Nights).
Dante in his Divine Comedy  sets the third part, Paradise amongst the planets where he meets the saints.

Early modern
The assumption of extraterrestrial life in the narrow sense (as opposed to generic cosmic pluralism) becomes possible with the development of the heliocentric understanding of the Solar System, and later the understanding of interstellar space, during the Early Modern period, and the topic was popular in the literature of the 17th and 18th centuries.

In Johannes Kepler's Somnium, published in 1634, the character Duracotus is transported to the moon by demons. Even if much of the story is fantasy, the scientific facts about the moon and how the lunar environment has shaped its non-human inhabitants are science fiction.

The didactic poet Henry More took up the classical theme of Cosmic pluralism of the Greek Democritus in "Democritus Platonissans, or an Essay Upon the Infinity of Worlds" (1647). With the new relative viewpoint that understood "our world's sunne / Becomes a starre elsewhere", More made the speculative leap to extrasolar planets,
the frigid spheres that 'bout them fare;
Which of themselves quite dead and barren are,
But by the wakening warmth of kindly dayes,
And the sweet dewie nights, in due course raise
Long hidden shapes and life, to their great Maker's praise.

The possibility of extraterrestrial life was a commonplace of educated discourse in the 17th century, though in Paradise Lost (1667) John Milton cautiously employed the conditional when the angel suggests to Adam the possibility of life on the Moon:
Her spots thou seest
As clouds, and clouds may rain, and rain produce
Fruits in her softened soil, for some to eat
Allotted there; and other Suns, perhaps,
With their attendant Moons, thou wilt descry,
Communicating male and female light,
Which two great sexes animate the World,
Stored in each Orb perhaps with some that live

Fontanelle's "Conversations on the Plurality of Worlds" with its similar excursions on the possibility of extraterrestrial life, expanding rather than denying the creative sphere of a Maker, was translated into English in 1686. In "The Excursion" (1728) David Mallet exclaimed, "Ten thousand worlds blaze forth; each with his train / Of peopled worlds." In 1752, Voltaire published the novella Micromégas, telling the story of a giant that visits earth to impart knowledge. Washington Irving in his novel, A History of New York from the Beginning of the World to the End of the Dutch Dynasty, spoke of earth being visited by Lunarians.

Camille Flammarion (1842-1925) who lived in a time where biological science had made further progress, made speculation about how life could have evolved on other planets in works such as La pluralité des mondes habités (The Plurality of Inhabited Worlds) (1862) and Recits de L'Infini (1872), translated as Stories of Infinity in 1873. Stories written before the genre of science fiction had found its form.

Closer to the modern age is J.-H. Rosny, who wrote the short story Les Xipéhuz (1887), about a human encounter with extraterrestrials who turn out to be a mineral life form impossible to communicate with.

Modern

Late 19th century-early 20th century 

Authors such as H. G. Wells, Olaf Stapledon and Edgar Rice Burroughs wrote both monitory and celebratory stories of encounting aliens in their science fiction and fantasies. Westfahl sums up: "To survey science fiction aliens, one can classify them by their physiology, character, and eventual relationships with humanity":
Early works posited that aliens would be identical or similar to humans, as is true of Edgar Rice Burroughs's Martians (see Mars; A Princess of Mars), with variations in skin color, size, and number of arms. ... Later writers realized that such humanoid aliens would not arise through parallel evolution and hence either avoided them or introduced the explanation of ancient races that populated the cosmos with similar beings. The notion surfaces in Ursula K. Le Guin's Hainish novels (see The Left Hand of Darkness; The Dispossessed) and was introduced to justify the humanoid aliens of Star Trek (who even intermarry and have children) in the Star Trek: The Next Generation episode "The Chase" (1993).Another common idea is aliens who closely resemble animals.

Among the many fictional aliens who resemble Earth's animals, Westfahl lists:
 Francis Flagg's The Lizard-Men of Buh-Lo (1930)
 the winged Hawk-Men of the serial Flash Gordon (1936) and its sequels
 the insect-like alien enemies of Robert A. Heinlein's Starship Troopers and Orson Scott Card's Ender's Game
 the cat-like aliens of Fritz Leiber's The Wanderer (1964)
 the "mog" - "half man, half dog" - of the farcical Spaceballs (1987)

Westfahl continues, "However, Stanley G. Weinbaum's A Martian Odyssey (1934) encouraged writers to create genuinely unusual aliens, not merely humans or animals in disguise. Olaf Stapledon also populated the universe with disparate aliens, including sentient stars, in Star Maker. Later, Hal Clement, a hard science fiction writer famed for strange but plausible worlds, also developed bizarre aliens in works like Cycle of Fire (1957)."

See also
Articles related to the phenomenon of extraterrestrials in fiction and popular culture:
 History of science fiction
 Alien invasion
Parasites in fiction
 List of fictional extraterrestrials
 List of films featuring extraterrestrials
List of humanoid aliens

Articles related to the purported or theorized existence of extraterrestrials:

 Beliefs in extraterrestrial life
 Grey alien, frequently reported alien in field of ufology, now with some usage in fiction and popular culture

References

Further reading
Roth, Christopher F., "Ufology as Anthropology: Race, Extraterrestrials, and the Occult."  In E.T. Culture: Anthropology in Outerspaces, ed. by Debbora Battaglia.  Durham, N.C.: Duke University Press, 2005.
 Sagan, Carl. 1996. ''The Demon-Haunted World: Science as a Candle in the Dark: chapter 4: "Aliens"

External links
 UFO occupants - grey and reptilian alien pictures
 ufologie.net - The Filiberto Caponi close encounter of the 3rd kind, 1993
 ufocasebook.com - Filiberto Caponi Close Encounter 1993
 The Ilkley Moor encounter of the 3rd kind, 1987
 UFO Magazine UK and Discussion Forum
 Jain, A.K - Professor
 Best Use of Aliens As Metaphor

1950s neologisms
Fiction about outer space
Science fiction themes